Kerr Creek is a ghost town located in the Similkameen Division Yale Land region of British Columbia. The town is situated near northeast of Midway, west of Grand Forks. It was founded in 1893 by Robert D. Kerr.

See also
List of ghost towns in British Columbia

References

Ghost towns in British Columbia
Similkameen Division Yale Land District